Zlatolist may refer to

 In Bulgaria (written in Cyrillic as Златолист):
 Zlatolist, Blagoevgrad Province - a village in the Sandanski municipality, Blagoevgrad Province
 Zlatolist, Kardzhali Province - a village in the Krumovgrad municipality, Kardzhali Province